An election to the Neath Rural District Council in West Glamorgan, Wales, was held in April 1928.  It was preceded by the 1925 election  and was followed by the 1931 election. The successful candidates were also elected to the Neath Board of Guardians.

Overview of the results
Many seats were closely contested and resulted in some Labour gains.

Ward Results

Baglan Higher (one seat)

Blaengwrach (one seats)

Blaenrhonddan (three seats)

Clyne (one seats)

Coedffranc (five seats)

Dyffryn Clydach (two seats)

Dulais Higher, Crynant Ward (one seats)

Dulais Higher, Onllwyn Ward (one seats)

Dulais Higher, Seven Sisters Ward (two seats)

Dulais Lower (one seat)

Michaelstone Higher (one seat)

Neath Higher (three seats)

Neath Lower (one seat)

Resolven, Cwmgwrach Ward (one seat)

Resolven, Resolven Ward (two seats)

Resolven, Rhigos Ward (two seats)

Resolven, Tonna Ward (one seat)

Ystradfellte (two seats)

References

20th century in Glamorgan